Seafret is a British music duo consisting of singer Jack Sedman and guitarist Harry Draper, from Bridlington, East Riding of Yorkshire, England. Their debut studio album Tell Me It's Real peaked at No. 59 on the UK Albums Chart.

Career
The duo formed in 2011 after Jack Sedman and Harry Draper met at an open mic night near their hometown of Bridlington. They were impressed with each other's performances, and quickly decided to work together as musicians. They lived close to the coast, and the name of the band referenced both the mist that rolls in from the North Sea during the summer, and a pun on a guitar fretboard. After gaining some traction online in 2014, they moved to London. In September 2014, they released their debut EP, Give Me Something. They released their second EP, Oceans in January 2015. They released their debut single, "Atlantis" in May 2015. They released the single "Be There" in June 2015. In October 2015, they released a cover of Bring Me the Horizon's "Drown". They released the single, "Wildfire" in November 2015. In January 2016, they released their debut studio album, Tell Me It's Real. The album peaked at number 59 on the UK Albums Chart. They released their third EP, Acoustic Sessions in August 2016. They released the single "Blank You Out" in November 2016. They released the single "Can't Look Away" in July 2018. They released the single "Monsters" in August 2018. They released their fourth EP, Monsters in September 2018.

Discography

Studio albums

Extended plays

Singles

As lead artist

Promotional singles

References

External links

 

British musical duos